Lower Matecumbe Key is an island in the upper Florida Keys, United States, located on U.S. 1 between mile markers 75–78.

All of the key is within the Village of Islamorada as of November 4, 1997, when it was incorporated.

It is home to the main base of the Florida National High Adventure Sea Base.

The island lies to the southwest of Upper Matecumbe Key, and to the northeast of Craig Key.

This key is the site of a number of Indian mounds and middens, most of which were destroyed during the building of the Overseas Railroad.  A number of natural wells were also located here, at the northeast end of the key.  These wells were well known to early seafaring men as the most reliable source of fresh water in the Keys.  They, too were destroyed during the railroad era, and the location of their site has been lost.  The southwestern end of the key is the site of a former sand mining operation.

Tourist attractions 
A local attraction is Anne's Beach, located at mile marker 74 on the east side (oceanside) of the roadway.

Education
It is in the Monroe County School District. The zoned K-8 is Plantation Key School on Plantation Key.

References 

Islands of the Florida Keys
Islands of Monroe County, Florida
Beaches of Monroe County, Florida
Beaches of Florida
Islands of Florida